Thoroughfare is a locality or small settlement located east of Clarenville, Newfoundland and Labrador. The post office closed in 1966 and mail was collected at British Harbour. The population was 62 in 1940.

See also
List of communities in Newfoundland and Labrador

References

Populated coastal places in Canada
Populated places in Newfoundland and Labrador